Tuzlu can refer to:

 Tuzlu, Ardabil
 Tuzlu, Çankırı
 Towzlu